Bicycle-friendly policies and practices help some people feel more comfortable about traveling by bicycle with other traffic.  The level of bicycle-friendliness of an environment can be influenced by many factors including town planning and cycling infrastructure decisions. A stigma towards people who ride bicycles and fear of cycling is a social construct that needs to be fully understood when promoting a bicycle friendly culture.

Urban planning

Assuming people prefer to get to their destination quickly, urban planning and zoning may affect whether schools, shops, public transport interchanges and other destination are within a reasonable cycling distance of the areas where people live.  If urban form influences these issues, then compact and circular settlement patterns as in Elizabeth, NJ may promote cycling. Alternatively, the low-density, non-circular (i.e., linear) settlement patterns characteristic of urban sprawl as in nearby downtown Newark tends to discourage cycling.  In 1990, the Dutch adopted the "ABC" guidelines, specifically limiting developments that are major attractants to locations that are readily accessible by non-car users.

The manner in which the public roads network is designed, built and managed can have a significant effect on the utility and safety of cycling as transport. Settlements that provide a dense roads network consisting of interconnected streets will tend to encourage cycling.

In contrast, other communities may use a cul-de-sac based, housing estate/housing subdivision model where minor roads are disconnected and only feed into a street hierarchy of progressively more "arterial" type roads. Designs that propose to resolve the contradiction between the cul-de-sac and the traditional interconnected network, such as the fused grid, have been proposed and built with varying levels of success.

In the UK, the principle of 'filtered permeability' has been proposed in some government guidance to maximise the ease of movement of cyclists and pedestrians, whilst constraining it for motor vehicles, see permeability.

Cycling infrastructure

Cycling infrastructure includes bikeways, maps, signs, signals, protected intersections and bicycle parking.

Selection of cycling-friendly infrastructure

Benefits of bicycle-friendly communities
A community's infrastructure can affect its citizens’ health, especially in regard to obesity and physical activity. Cities that incorporate bicycle routes have a higher percentage of bicycle commuters. Studies have shown that even moderate increases in physical activity can have a substantial effect on health. Bicycling to work has been shown to decrease mortality by as much as 40%.

Bicycling is often used as an alternative to travel by car. Automobile travel provides the perception of increased mobility and convenience for travelers, but also has high costs associated with taxes, insurance, fuel, maintenance, road construction and repair, and contributes to air pollution. When infrastructure is built to allow consumers to choose between automobile and other forms of travel, it reduces a community's automobile dependency and allows for more efficient transport choices and land usage.

Recognition
In the U.S., the League of American Bicyclists has formally recognized some cities as bicycle-friendly communities for "providing safe accommodation and facilities for bicyclists and encouraging residents to bike for transportation and recreation."

Tourism

The British tourist board award holiday accommodation providers who are cycle friendly with a "Cycle Friendly" award.

The League of American Bicyclists designated New Orleans as a Bicycle Friendly City in 2011.

See also

Cyclability

Mikael Colville-Andersen
 Outline of cycling
Principles of intelligent urbanism
Road safety

Urban vitality

References

External links
Cycling for Everyone: Lessons for Vancouver from the Netherlands, Denmark, and Germany (video of lecture by John Pucher)
Walking, Bicycling and Public Spaces: Experiences from Bogota and Beyond  (video of lecture by Gil Peñalosa of Walk and Bike for Life)

Livable Communities Resource Guide

Cycling infrastructure